Le Parrain is a mountain of the Swiss Pennine Alps, located east of Fionnay in the canton of Valais. Its summit (3,259 m) lies within the valley of Bagnes but near the watershed with the valley of Hérens.

"Le Parrain" is a common name for designating the godfather in French, hence the mountain's name is in English "The Godfather".

References

External links
 Le Parrain on Hikr

Mountains of the Alps
Alpine three-thousanders
Mountains of Switzerland
Mountains of Valais